Sherman Moreland (October 16, 1868 – December 27, 1951) was an American lawyer and politician from New York and the Philippines.

Early life
He was born on October 16, 1868, in Van Etten, Chemung County, New York. He attended the district school. Then, he worked for two years in a bark mill and then as a clerk in a hardware store. In 1888, he enrolled at Cornell University and graduated B.Litt. in 1892. He graduated LL.B. from Cornell Law School in 1894, was admitted to the bar in 1896, and practiced law in Van Etten.

Political career
Moreland was a member of the New York State Assembly (Chemung Co.) in 1903, 1904, 1905, 1906 and 1907; and was Majority Leader in 1906 and 1907. In 1907, he sponsored the Moreland Act, which allows the governor to investigate any public department within the state, a power previously held only by the legislature.

Later life
In 1909, Moreland was appointed by President Theodore Roosevelt to the Supreme Court of the Philippines. In 1911, he acted briefly as Dean of the University of the Philippines College of Law when the latter was established. He remained on the bench until 1917, when he joined the Judge Advocate General's Corps, United States Army. He appeared as chief prosecutor at the court-martial of Col. Billy Mitchell in 1925. He retired, with the rank of colonel, from the army in 1929 and resumed his law practice in Van Etten.

He died on December 27, 1951, at his home in Van Etten, New York; and was buried at the Canfield Cemetery there.

References

External links

1868 births
1951 deaths
People from Chemung County, New York
Cornell Law School alumni
Republican Party members of the New York State Assembly
Associate Justices of the Supreme Court of the Philippines
United States Army officers